Kitty-Lynn Joustra (born 11 January 1998) is a Dutch water polo player for the University of California, Berkeley and the Dutch national team.

She participated at the 2018 Women's European Water Polo Championship.

References

External links
 

1998 births
Living people
Dutch female water polo players
Expatriate water polo players
Dutch expatriate sportspeople in the United States
California Golden Bears women's water polo players
Water polo players at the 2020 Summer Olympics
Olympic water polo players of the Netherlands
World Aquatics Championships medalists in water polo
21st-century Dutch women